Speia is a village in the Anenii Noi District of Moldova.

References

Villages of Anenii Noi District
Populated places on the Dniester